Avonite Surfaces is an acrylic solid surface material brand.

External links 
 
"Slabs of Color", Popular Science, June 1989
"High-Tech Countertop: How to build a new countertop with the latest material", Popular Mechanics, April 1990
Cabinets and Countertops, Taunton Press, 2006
"A Solid History: Reviewing 40 Years Of Solid Surface", Surface Fabrication, November 2007
The professional practice of architectural detailing, Wiley, 1987

Building materials
Kitchen countertops